This is a list of the governors of the province of Kunduz, Afghanistan.

Governors of Kunduz Province

See also
 List of Afghanistan governors

Notes

Kunduz